Terry Hogan may refer to:

Hulk Hogan, wrestler
Terence Hogan, Terry "Lucky Tel" Hogan, criminal